Joseph P. Mohorovic was a member of the U.S. Consumer Product Safety Commission.  He resigned from the Commission effective October 20, 2017, to join a law firm and work in Chicago and Washington, D.C.

Before taking office as commissioner, Mohorovic was an executive at the testing firm Intertek, and previously worked as a member of the staff of then-CPSC Chairman Hal Stratton. Before that, he served as a member of the New Mexico House of Representatives. He served as a cochair of the Illinois campaign of John Kasich.

References

External links
Official CPSC press release re Commissioner Mohorovic

Living people
University of Texas at Austin alumni
University of New Mexico alumni
Consumer rights activists
U.S. Consumer Product Safety Commission personnel
Obama administration personnel
Republican Party members of the New Mexico House of Representatives
Year of birth missing (living people)